The Grenzgipfel (4,618 m) (German for Border Summit) is a peak of Monte Rosa Massif (Pennine Alps), located on the border between Italy and Switzerland.

The Grenzgipfel is the highest summit on the Italian side of the Monte Rosa massif and the highest point of the entire border between Italy and Switzerland; it is also the culminating point of the Italian region of Piedmont and of the Ticino river drainage basin.

The closest locality is Macugnaga, which is located east of the Monte Rosa Massif.

See also
 List of Italian regions by highest point

References

External links
 The Monte Rosa group on SummitPost
 Grenzgipfel on Hikr

Alpine four-thousanders
Mountains of Valais
Pennine Alps
Mountains of Piedmont
Italy–Switzerland border
International mountains of Europe
Monte Rosa
Mountains of the Alps
Mountains of Switzerland
Four-thousanders of Switzerland